Cláudia Carceroni-Saintagne (born 8 November 1962) is a road cyclist from Brazil. She represented her nation at the 1992 Summer Olympics in the women's road race and at the 2000 Summer Olympics in the women's road race.

References

External links
 Profile at sports-reference.com

Brazilian female cyclists
Brazilian road racing cyclists
Cyclists at the 1992 Summer Olympics
Cyclists at the 2000 Summer Olympics
Olympic cyclists of Brazil
Living people
Sportspeople from Belo Horizonte
1962 births